Tatiana Tibuleac (born 15 October 1978) is a Moldovan writer. She was born in Chisinau and studied journalism and communications at Moldova State University. She first gained renown for her "True Stories" column which appeared in the Flux newspaper in the mid-1990s. She also worked as a TV reporter and news anchor in Chisinau. She moved to Paris in 2008.

She published her first book Fabule Moderne (short stories) in 2014, and her first novel Vara în care mama a avut ochii verzi in 2017. The novel won multiple literary prizes and has been translated into French and Spanish. Her second novel Grădina de sticlă won the EU Prize for Literature.

Published works 

 2014 Fabule Moderne
 2017 Vara în care mama a avut ochii verzi
 2018 Grădina de sticlă

References

Moldovan writers
1978 births
Living people